Flip-flops are a type of light sandal, typically worn as a form of casual footwear. They consist of a flat sole held loosely on the foot by a Y-shaped strap known as a toe thong that passes between the first and second toes and around both sides of the foot. This style of footwear has been worn by the people of many cultures throughout the world, originating as early as the ancient Egyptians in 1,500 B.C. In the United States the modern flip-flop may have had its design taken from the traditional Japanese zōri, after World War II as soldiers brought them back from Japan.

Flip-flops became a prominent unisex summer footwear starting in the 1960s.

"Flip-flop" etymology and other names
The term flip-flop has been used in American and British English since the 1960s to describe inexpensive footwear consiting of a flat base, typically rubber, and a strap with three anchor points: between the big and second toes, then bifurcating to anchor on both sides of the foot. "Flip-flop" may be an onomatopoeia of the sound made by the sandals when walking in them. 

Flip-flops are also called thongs (sometimes pluggers) in Australia, jandals (originally a trademarked name derived from "Japanese sandals") in New Zealand, and slops or plakkies in South Africa and Zimbabwe.

In the Philippines, tsinelas. In India, chappal, (which traditionally referred to a leather slipper). In Latin America, La Chancla. Throughout the world, they are also known by a variety of other names, including slippers in Bahamas, Jamaica and Trinidad and Tobago.

History

Thong sandals have been worn for thousands of years, dating back to pictures of them in ancient Egyptian murals from 4,000 BC. A pair found in Europe was made of papyrus leaves and dated to be approximately 1,500 years old. These early versions of flip-flops were made from a wide variety of materials. Ancient Egyptian sandals were made from papyrus and palm leaves. The Maasai people of Africa made them out of rawhide. In India, they were made from wood. In China and Japan, rice straw was used. The leaves of the sisal plant were used to make twine for sandals in South America, while the natives of Mexico used the yucca plant.

The Ancient Greeks and Romans wore versions of flip-flops as well. In Greek sandals, the toe strap was worn between the first and second toes, while Roman sandals had the strap between the second and third toes. These differ from the sandals worn by the Mesopotamians, with the strap between the third and fourth toes. In India, a related "toe knob" sandal was common, with no straps but instead a small knob located between the first and second toes. They are known as Padukas.

The modern flip-flop became popular in the United States as soldiers returning from World War II brought Japanese zōri with them. It caught on in the 1950s during the postwar boom and after the end of hostilities of the Korean War. As they became adopted into American popular culture, the sandals were redesigned and changed into the bright colors that dominated 1950s design. They quickly became popular due to their convenience and comfort, and were popular in beach-themed stores and as summer shoes. During the 1960s, flip-flops became firmly associated with the beach lifestyle of California. As such, they were promoted as primarily a casual accessory, typically worn with shorts, bathing suits, or summer dresses. As they became more popular, some people started wearing them for dressier or more formal occasions.

In 1962, Alpargatas S.A. marketed a version of flip-flops known as Havaianas in Brazil. By 2010, more than 150 million pairs of Havaianas were produced each year. By 2019, production tops 200 million pairs per year. Prices range from under $5 for basics to more than $50 for high-end fashion models.

Flip-flops quickly became popular as casual footwear of young adults. Girls would often decorate their flip-flops with metallic finishes, charms, chains, beads, rhinestones, or other jewelry. Modern flip-flops are available in leather, suede, and synthetic materials. Platform and high-heeled variants of the sandals began to appear in the 1990s, and in the late 2010s, kitten heeled "kit-flops".

In the U.S., flip-flops with college colors and logos became common, for fans to wear to intercollegiate games. In 2011, while vacationing in his native Hawaii, Barack Obama became the first President of the United States to be photographed wearing a pair of flip-flops. The Dalai Lama of Tibet is also a frequent wearer of flip-flops and has met with several U.S. presidents, including George W. Bush and Barack Obama, while wearing the sandals.

While exact sales figures for flip-flops are difficult to obtain due to the large number of stores and manufacturers involved, the Atlanta-based company Flip Flop Shops claimed that the shoes were responsible for a $20 billion industry in 2009. Furthermore, sales of flip-flops exceeded those of sneakers for the first time in 2006. If these figures are accurate, it is remarkable considering the low cost of most flip-flops.

Design and custom

The modern flip-flop has a straightforward design, consisting of a thin sole with two straps running in a Y shape from the sides of the foot to the gap between the big toe and the one beside it. Flip-flops are made from a wide variety of materials, as were the ancient thong sandals. The modern sandals are made of more modern materials, such as rubber, foam, plastic, leather, suede, and even fabric. Flip-flops made of polyurethane have caused some environmental concerns; because polyurethane is a number 7 resin, they can't be easily discarded, and they persist in landfills for a very long time. In response to these concerns, some companies have begun selling flip-flops made from recycled rubber, such as that from used bicycle tires, or even hemp, and some offer a recycling program for used flip flops.

Because of the strap between the toes, flip-flops are typically not worn with socks. In colder weather, however, some people wear flip-flops with toe socks or merely pull standard socks forward and bunch them up between the toes. The Japanese commonly wear tabi, a type of sock with a single slot for the thong, with their zōri.

Flip-flop health issues
Flip-flops provide the wearer with some mild protection from hazards on the ground, such as sharp rocks, splintery wooden surfaces, hot sand at the beach, broken glass, or even fungi and wart-causing viruses in locker rooms or community pool surfaces. However, walking for long periods in flip-flops can result in pain in the feet, ankles and lower legs or tendonitis

The flip-flop straps may cause frictional issues, such as rubbing during walking, resulting in blisters,  and the open-toed design may result in stubbed  or even broken toes.
Particularly, individuals with flat feet or other foot issues are advised to wear a shoe or sandal with better support.

The American Podiatric Medical Association strongly recommends that people not play sports in flip-flops, or do any type of yard work with or without power tools, including cutting the grass, when they wear these shoes. There are reports of people who ran or jumped in flip-flops and suffered sprained ankles, fractures, and severe ligament injuries that required surgery.

Because they provide almost no protection from the sun, on a part of the body more heavily exposed and where sunscreen can more easily be washed off, sunburn can be a risk for flip-flop wearers.

Flip-flops in popular culture
For Latinos, "La Chancla" (the flip-flop), held or thrown, is a tool of child discipline. In public, sassing back to one's mother is well known to elicit being wacked on the head with a flip-flop. At home, thrown, to the same effect. Even the threat - mom reaching down to take off a flip-flop and hold it in her raised hand - is considered enough to improve behavior. There is a popular humorous video The Secret of La Chancla about why Hispanic children are "so well behaved," with the claims "The secret is Hispanic culture, which emphasizes boundaries, developmental growth, and a traditional technique known as ... 'La Chancla'." Ending "chancla culture" is the subject of a serious essay "The Meaning of Chancla: Flip Flops and Discipline."

In India, a chappal is traditionally a leather slipper, but the term has also come to include flip-flops. A mother's corporal punishment was often with a chappal, striking the child on the buttocks, hands or about the head and shoulders. Throwing a chappal became a video trope, "flying chappal," and "Flying chappal received" an expression by an adult acknowledging that they had been verbally chastised by their parents or other adults.

Flip-flops are "tsinelas" in the Philippines, derived from the Spanish "chinela" (for slipper), and are used to discipline children, but with no mention of throwing. And children play Tumbang preso, which involves trying to knock over a can with thrown flip-flops.

See also
 Hnyat-phanat (Burmese)
 Sandal
 Slipper
 Slippering (corporal punishment)
 Slide (footwear)

References

External links

Sandals
1960s fashion
1970s fashion
1980s fashion
1990s fashion
2000s fashion
2010s fashion
2020s fashion
Australian fashion
Australian clothing
Shoes
Japanese inventions